Raymond Cho Wing-Lim (born 16 October 1964) is a Hong Kong television actor, singer and host. He currently works for the television company, TVB.

Cho began his career as a singer, winning a singing competition when he was 30 years old. After an unsuccessful attempt at being a singer, he gave acting a try. After filming some movies, he joined TVB. Notable dramas he has starred in are: Healing Hands II (2000), Healing Hands III (2005), Welcome to the House (2006), and At Home With Love (2006).

Cho married Elaine Chiang, the oldest daughter of Hong Kong actor David Chiang, on 28 November 2007. Their son, Brandon Cho, was born in 2008. Their second daughter, Erin Cho, was born in 2011.

Filmography

TV dramas

Film

Political participation
Cho is amongst many Hong Kong celebrities with patriotic stances in support of Chinese nationalism, usually expressing speeches on his social media sites backing The Government of the Hong Kong Special Administration Region, and the Chief Executives Leung Chun-ying (from the 2014 Hong Kong protests) and the incumbent Carrie Lam. Most of Cho's speeches are unpleasant on specific politicians or actors in favour from the pro-democratic camp, which has led to doxxing and death threats while gaining appreciation by the medias of and supporters from the pro-Beijing camp.

In 2016, Cho posted a message on Weibo, which he regarded the Rules of Law in Hong Kong "is dying" when the Spokesman of Hong Kong Indigenous - Edward Leung in 2016 Mong Kok civil unrest was judged as innocence.
  
On 20 May 2019, Cho responded on a Facebook news article written about activist Joshua Wong, and made a post celebrating Wong's time in jail. Afterwards, he  replied: "" (Cantonese: "Wishing him a death very soon"). Cho's replies garnered massive controversy around the internet sphere as numerous Hong Kong netizens back. Cho then added with a provocative tone that he would not argue with “trash when it is meaningless”.

External links
Official TVB blog of Raymond Cho

References

Hong Kong Buddhists
Hong Kong male television actors
TVB veteran actors
Living people
1965 births
20th-century Hong Kong male actors
21st-century Hong Kong male actors
Hong Kong male film actors